Earl W. Hanson (October 17, 1888 – December 22, 1950) was an American banker and member of the Wisconsin State Assembly.

Biography
Hanson was born  in Elk Mound, Wisconsin. He was the son of Nels Hanson (1842-1924) and Marie (Christopherson) Hanson (1861-1950). His father was an immigrant from Norway. During World War I, he served in the United States Army. He was employed as cashier of the Bank of Elk Mound.Additionally, he was clerk, trustee and president of Elk Mound and Chairman of the Dunn County, Wisconsin Board.

Political career
Hanson was a Republican.  He served as a member of the Wisconsin State Assembly from 1939 until his death in 1950.

References

1888 births
1950 deaths
People from Elk Mound, Wisconsin
County supervisors in Wisconsin
Republican Party members of the Wisconsin State Assembly
Military personnel from Wisconsin
United States Army soldiers
United States Army personnel of World War I
20th-century American politicians
American people of Norwegian descent